Spirit is an unincorporated community located in the town of Spirit, Price County, Wisconsin, United States.

According to tradition, Spirit was named from the simultaneous sighting of several ghosts at a nearby lake.

References

Unincorporated communities in Price County, Wisconsin
Unincorporated communities in Wisconsin